Branko Panić (born 24 November 1977) is a retired Croatian footballer.

Career
Panić previously played for HNK Rijeka and NK Pomorac in the Croatian Prva HNL and for KS Flamurtari Vlorë in Albania.

References

External links

1977 births
Living people
Footballers from Rijeka
Association football defenders
Croatian footballers
HNK Rijeka players
NK Istra players
HNK Orijent players
NK Pomorac 1921 players
Sabah F.C. (Malaysia) players
NK Croatia Sesvete players
Flamurtari Vlorë players
NK Grobničan players
Croatian Football League players
First Football League (Croatia) players
Malaysia Super League players
Kategoria Superiore players
Croatian expatriate footballers
Expatriate footballers in Malaysia
Croatian expatriate sportspeople in Malaysia
Expatriate footballers in Albania
Croatian expatriate sportspeople in Albania